The 2013 Shoot-Out was held from September 12 to 15 at the Saville Sports Centre in Edmonton, Alberta as part of the 2013–14 World Curling Tour. Both the men's and women's events are being held in a triple-knockout format. The purse for the men's event was CAD$18,000, of which the winner, Kevin Martin, received CAD$5,000, while the purse for the women's event was CAD$26,000, of which the winner, Crystal Webster, received CAD$5,000. Martin defeated Steve Laycock in the final with a score of 3–2, while Webster defeated Chantelle Eberle in the final with a score of 10–6 in seven ends.

Men

Teams
The teams are listed as follows:

Knockout results
The draw is listed as follows:

A event

B event

C event

Playoffs
The playoffs draw is listed as follows:

Women

Teams
The teams are listed as follows:

Knockout results
The draw is listed as follows:

A event

B event

C event

Playoffs
The playoffs draw is listed as follows:

References

External links

2013 in Canadian curling
The Shoot-Out